The men's mass start race of the 2013–14 ISU Speed Skating World Cup 5, arranged in Eisstadion Inzell, in Inzell, Germany, was held on 8 March 2014.

The champion from the previous season, Arjan Stroetinga of the Netherlands, won the race, while Bart Swings of Belgium came second, and Bob de Vries of the Netherlands came third.

Results
The race took place on Saturday, 8 March, scheduled in the afternoon session, at 16:34.

References

Men mass start
5